Max Anchor (born July 21, 2004) is a professional Canadian soccer player who plays as a goalkeeper for Vancouver Whitecaps FC in Major League Soccer.

Early life
Anchor began playing youth soccer at age 4 with Coquitlam Metro-Ford SC. He later played with Mountain United FC, before joining the Vancouver Whitecaps FC Academy in 2016 as a 12 year old. He was named the Whitecaps 2021 Male Academy Player of the Year.

Club career
Ahead of the 2022 season, Anchor attended the full pre-season with Major League Soccer club Vancouver Whitecaps FC. On May 21, 2022, Anchor signed a professional contract with the second team Whitecaps FC 2 of MLS Next Pro. On the same day, he was signed to a short-term loan with the first team, as the team's goalkeepers were all unavailable due to injury and health-and-safety protocols. In addition, he also signed a pre-contract to join the first team for the 2023 season as a homegrown player. He made his professional debut the next day against Charlotte FC, becoming the second-youngest goalkeeper to start an MLS game. After the match, he joined the second team, going on to make five appearances that season in MLS Next Pro.

International career
In July 2019, Anchor was called up to the Canada U15 team for the 2019 CONCACAF Boys' Under-15 Championship.

In April 2022, Anchor was called to a camp for the Canada U20 team.

Career statistics

Club

References

2004 births
Living people
Canadian soccer players
Association football goalkeepers
Whitecaps FC 2 players
Vancouver Whitecaps FC players
Major League Soccer players
Canada men's youth international soccer players
MLS Next Pro players